HMS Berry (K312) was a , built in the United States as a , and transferred to the Royal Navy under the terms of Lend-Lease, which served in the Second World War. She was named after Rear Admiral Sir Edward Berry (1768-1831).

The name Berry was originally assigned to the Evarts-class destroyer escort, BDE-14, laid down on 28 February 1942. When that ship was retained by the United States Navy and renamed , the name was transferred to another ship.

The new Berry (BDE-3) was laid down on 22 September 1942 by the Boston Navy Yard, launched on 23 November 1942, and commissioned into the Royal Navy on 15 March 1943.

Service history
During World War II, HMS Berry operated in the Atlantic Ocean and the Bay of Biscay in 1943 and 1944. After the war, Berry was returned to the U.S. Navy at the Philadelphia Naval Shipyard on 2 February 1946. Her name was struck from the Navy list on 12 March 1946, and she was sold to the North American Smelting Co., of Philadelphia. That firm took possession of her on 9 November 1946 and completed her scrapping on 4 November 1948.

References

External links
 

Captain-class frigates
Evarts-class destroyer escorts
World War II frigates of the United Kingdom
Ships built in Boston
1942 ships
Ships transferred from the United States Navy to the Royal Navy